Philip Niarchos (alternately: Philippos or Philippe) (born 1954) is a Greek billionaire, the eldest son of the Greek shipping magnate Stavros Niarchos and Eugenia Livanos, herself the elder daughter of Stavros Niarchos' rival Stavros G. Livanos.

Inheritance and work 

Philip Niarchos was reported to be 54 in 2008 when The Sunday Times estimated his net worth at GBP 850 million, or about $1.687 billion US at that exchange rate of that time. He is a member of the board of trustees at the Museum of Modern Art in New York City and an international council member of London's Tate Gallery. He was educated at Institut Le Rosey in Switzerland.

Alongside his younger brother, Spyros, Niarchos is co-president and member of the board of directors at the Stavros Niarchos Foundation. The foundation is one of the world’s largest global private philanthropies founded over 25 years ago with a total of $3.3 billion awarded across 5,00 grants, focuses on global funding for physical and mental health. In 2022, the foundation announced a $15 million commitment for a youth mental health program in Greece collaborating with The Child Mind institute and The Greek Ministry of Health.

Art collector 
Niarchos owns his late father's art collection. The late Stavros Niarchos amassed one of the "most important collections of Impressionist and modern art in private hands." Among the collection's trophies are Pablo Picasso's self-portrait Yo, Picasso, which the father had bought in 1989 for $47,850,000.

Niarchos has made plenty of additions to his father's legacy. He was suspected as being the anonymous buyer of Vincent van Gogh's "Self-Portrait", at a November 1998 Christie's auction; it sold for $71.5 million. He was certainly at the auction and was revealed as the anonymous buyer of Jean-Michel Basquiat's 1982 Self-Portrait, which closed at $3.3 million. In 1994, he bought Andy Warhol's Red Marilyn, at Christie's for $3.63 million. Andy Warhol's skull portraits are from Niarchos' CAT scan. Warhol completed these works in 1985, using silkscreens made from CAT-scan films of the skull of Philip Niarchos, who commissioned the artist to paint his portrait. Niarchos is mentioned throughout The Andy Warhol Diaries. Warhol shares details of the dysfunctional relationship Niarchos had with the divorced and widowed socialite Barbara (née Tanner) de Kwiatkowski. Her married name was Barbara Allen at the time of her relationship with Niarchos; now she is the widow of Henryk de Kwiatkowski.

Marriage and family 

In 1984, Niarchos married, for the third time, Victoria Christina Guinness (born 1960), daughter of Patrick Benjamin Guinness (of the banking branch of the Guinness family) and Dolores Guinness (1936–2012). Niarchos and Guinness have two sons and two daughters:
Stavros Niarchos II (born 1985). In October 2019, he married Dasha Zhukova, in a civil ceremony in Paris.
Eugenie Niarchos (born 1986), a jewelry designer.
Theodorakis Niarchos (born 1991)
Electra Niarchos (born 1995)
 
Niarchos was a first cousin, and step-brother, of the late heiress Christina Onassis whose mother Athina Livanos (1929–1974) was a younger sister of his own mother and later became his father's last wife. Niarchos is a first cousin once removed of Athina Onassis de Miranda.

References

External links 
The Stavros Niarchos Foundation

Living people
Niarchos family
1954 births
Greek businesspeople in shipping
Greek billionaires
Greek art collectors
Greek socialites
People from Athens
Alumni of Institut Le Rosey